Trout Brook may refer to:
Massachusetts
Trout Brook (Massachusetts), a stream in Holden, Massachusetts
Minnesota
Trout Brook (Ramsey County, Minnesota), a stream in Ramsey County, Minnesota
Miesville Ravine Park Reserve#Trout Brook, a stream in Dakota County, Minnesota
Afton State Park#Trout Brook, a stream in Pine County, Minnesota
New York
Trout Brook (East Branch Delaware River), a stream in Delaware County, New York
Trout Brook (Beaver Kill), a stream in Delaware County, New York
Trout Brook (Otsego Lake tributary), a stream in Otsego County, New York
Nova Scotia
Trout Brook, Nova Scotia, a community in Nova Scotia
Pennsylvania
Trout Brook (South Branch Tunkhannock Creek), in Lackawanna County and Wyoming County, Pennsylvania
Trout Brook (Toby Creek), in Luzerne County, Pennsylvania
Vermont
Trout River (Vermont), a tributary of the Missisquoi River
Wyoming
Trout Brook (South Branch Tunkhannock Creek), a stream in Lackawanna County, Wyoming

See also
Trout Creek (disambiguation)
Trout Run (disambiguation)